Sonua railway station is a railway station on Howrah–Nagpur–Mumbai line under Chakradharpur railway division of South Eastern Railway zone. It is situated at Sonua, West Singhbhum district in the Indian state of Jharkhand.

References

Railway stations in West Singhbhum district
Chakradharpur railway division